The winners and nominees of the Asia Pacific Screen Awards for Achievement in Cinematography are:

Winners and Nominees

2000s

2010s

External links 
 Official Website

References 

Awards for best cinematography